Conference USA (C-USA or CUSA) is an intercollegiate athletic conference whose current member institutions are located within the Southern United States. The conference participates in the NCAA's Division I in all sports. C-USA's offices are located in Dallas, Texas.

History 

C-USA was founded in 1995 by the merger of the Metro Conference and Great Midwest Conference, two Division I conferences that did not sponsor football. However, the merger did not include either Great Midwest member Dayton or Metro members VCU and Virginia Tech. Since this left an uneven number of schools in the conference, Houston of the dissolving Southwest Conference was extended an invitation and agreed to join following the SWC's disbanding at the end of the 1995–96 academic year. The conference immediately started competition in all sports, except football which started in 1996. Being the result of a merger, C-USA was originally a sprawling, large league that stretched from Florida to Missouri, Wisconsin to Texas. Many of its original schools were located in major urban centers and had strong basketball traditions, which helped establish the league on a national basis.

2005–06 realignment
The conference saw radical changes for the 2005–06 academic year. The Big East Conference had lost several members, and looked to Conference USA to attract replacements. Five C-USA members departed for the Big East, including three football-playing schools (Cincinnati, Louisville, and South Florida) and two non-football schools (DePaul and Marquette; both joined the New Big East in 2013). Another two schools (Charlotte and Saint Louis) left for the Atlantic 10; TCU joined the Mountain West (and is now in the Big 12 with several other former Southwest Conference members); and a ninth member, Army, which was C-USA football-only, opted to become an independent in that sport again.

With the loss of these members, C-USA lured six schools from other conferences: UCF and Marshall from the MAC, as well as Rice, SMU, Tulsa, and later UTEP from the WAC. Note that UCF played in the MAC for football only; for all other sports, it was a member of the Atlantic Sun Conference (now known as the ASUN Conference).

With C-USA's membership now consisting of 12 schools, all of which sponsor football, the conference adopted a two-division alignment.

2013–14 realignment

In 2013, C-USA entered its next phase with the departure of four schools (Houston, Memphis, SMU, and UCF) for the American Athletic Conference, the football-sponsoring portion of the former Big East Conference. This was again the result of Big East schools leaving for the ACC, this time being Syracuse and Pittsburgh. It was announced in early 2012 that Conference USA was in talks with the Mountain West Conference about forming either a football alliance or conference merger in the future.

However, when the conferences discussed their plans with the NCAA, they were told that if they merged, the new league would receive only one automatic bid to NCAA championships; at least one of the former conferences would lose expected future revenues from the NCAA men's basketball tournament; and at least one former conference would lose exit fees from any schools that departed for the new league. As a result, both C-USA and the MW backed away from a full merger. , the likeliest scenario was an all-sports alliance in which both conferences retain separate identities. However, after the MW added more members, the alliance was apparently abandoned.

For men's soccer, there was a chance that the MW, SEC, and C-USA along with the one Sun Belt member (FIU), that sponsor the sport, would play under the C-USA's men's soccer program. The MW, which does not sponsor men's soccer, would take three of the four members that offer the sport (UNLV, Air Force, New Mexico—San Diego State is a Pac-12 associate member in that sport), join C-USA's three full members that offer the sport (UAB, Marshall, Tulsa), the two SEC members already in C-USA for the sport (Kentucky, South Carolina), and the Sun Belt's FIU. However, the only MW member school that ultimately moved to C-USA men's soccer was New Mexico.

For the 2013–14 season C-USA invited five new members to join their conference, with all accepting. UTSA and Louisiana Tech joined from the WAC and North Texas and FIU, (an affiliate member of C-USA joining for men's soccer in 2005), from the Sun Belt Conference. Old Dominion, which already housed five of its sports in C-USA, moved the rest of its athletic program from the CAA (except for field hockey, women's lacrosse and wrestling, with the three sports joining the new Big East, the Atlantic Sun, and the MAC respectively because C-USA does not sponsor those sports) and upgraded its football program from the Football Championship Subdivision. Charter member Charlotte returned from the A-10 and accelerated its recently established football program, which was set to begin play in 2013 as an FCS school, to FBS in 2015 with full conference rights in 2016.

2014–15 realignment

On November 27, 2012, it was announced that Tulane would leave the conference to join the Big East in all sports, and East Carolina would join the Big East for football only (ECU's membership was upgraded to all-sports in March 2013 after the Big East's non-football members, except ACC-bound Notre Dame, announced they were leaving to form a new conference which took the Big East name, leaving the football-playing members to become the American Athletic Conference). Conference USA responded by adding Middle Tennessee and Florida Atlantic, both from the Sun Belt.

On April 1, 2013, Conference USA announced they were adding Western Kentucky, also from the Sun Belt, to offset Tulsa's departure to The American in all sports which was confirmed the next day.

The board of trustees in the University of Alabama system (of which UAB is a member) voted to shut down that football program on December 2, 2014, in a highly controversial move that many have attributed to a pro-Tuscaloosa bias (including trustees such as Paul Bryant, Jr., son and namesake of Alabama football coaching legend Bear Bryant). According to Conference USA bylaws, member schools must sponsor football. In January 2015, UAB announced an independent re-evaluation of the program and the finances involved, leaving open a possible resumption of the program as early as the 2016 season. On January 29, 2015, the conference announced that there was no time pressure in making a decision regarding UAB's future membership. The conference also stated that it would wait for the new study results before any further discussions on the subject. On June 1, UAB announced that it would reinstate football effective with the 2016 season, presumably keeping the school in C-USA for the immediate future. The return of football was later pushed back to 2017.  The Blazers won the 2018 conference championship their second year back and won the C-USA title again in 2020.

2015–2021

Commissioner Britton Banowsky stepped down on September 15, 2015, to become the head of the College Football Playoff Foundation. Executive associate commissioner and chief operating officer Judy MacLeod was subsequently named interim commissioner. On October 26 MacLeod was named the conference's third official commissioner, also becoming the first woman to head an FBS conference.

Marshall University's men's soccer program captured the league's first team national championship with its 1–0 overtime win over Indiana in the 2020 College Cup, held in May 2021 due to COVID-19 issues, in Cary, North Carolina.

2020s realignment 

On October 18, 2021, Yahoo Sports reported that the American Athletic Conference, which had been rocked by the impending departure of three of its most prominent schools (Cincinnati, Houston, UCF) for the Big 12 Conference, was preparing to receive applications from six C-USA members: Charlotte, Florida Atlantic, North Texas, Rice, UAB, and UTSA. ESPN reported the next day that The American had received all six schools' applications, and The American announced all six as future members on October 21, though it did not announce the effective date. The entry date would eventually be confirmed as July 1, 2023.

The day after The American announced its expansion, The Action Network reported that Southern Miss had accepted an invitation to join the Sun Belt Conference in 2023, a move which was formally announced by the university on October 26. The report added that the Sun Belt was preparing to add two other C-USA members in Marshall and Old Dominion, as well as FCS program James Madison. Old Dominion officially announced its move to the Sun Belt Conference on October 27, followed later in the week by Marshall. On March 29, 2022 C-USA agreed to allow Marshall, Old Dominion, and Southern Miss to move to the Sun Belt beginning July 1, 2022, a year earlier than initially announced.

In response to these losses, on November 5, Conference USA announced the addition of four new members to start the 2023 athletic season.  These included two ASUN Conference schools, Liberty and Jacksonville State, along with two from the WAC, New Mexico State and Sam Houston. Liberty and New Mexico State previously played football as FBS independents, while Jacksonville State and Sam Houston played at the FCS level in their respective conferences.

On October 7, Pete Thamel of ESPN reported that current football-sponsoring ASUN member Kennesaw State was in talks to become the tenth member of Conference USA for the 2024 season. One week later, C-USA officially announced Kennesaw State's 2024 entry.

The Sun Belt Conference added beach volleyball for the 2023 season (2022–23 school year), taking with it the three full SBC members that had previously housed that sport in C-USA: Coastal Carolina, Georgia State, and Louisiana–Monroe. Southern Miss also left C-USA beach volleyball as part of its full-time move to the SBC. C-USA would add three new beach volleyball members for that season; Jacksonville State joined C-USA for beach volleyball in advance of full membership that July, Tulane became an associate member, and full member UTEP added a new beach volleyball program.

Hall of Fame

In 2019, Conference USA inducted its first Hall of Fame class, comprising 20 student-athletes, three coaches, and two administrators. The inductees included former University of Cincinnati basketball player Kenyon Martin, baseball player Kevin Youkilis, and men's basketball head coach Bob Huggins.

Member schools

Current members
Departing members are highlighted in pink.

Notes

Future members

Affiliate members
In this table, all dates reflect the calendar year of entry into Conference USA, which for spring sports is the year before the start of competition.

Current 

Notes

Former members

Notes

Former affiliate members
In this table, all dates reflect each school's actual entry into and departure from Conference USA. For spring sports, the joining date is the calendar year before the start of competition. For fall sports, the departure date is the calendar year after the last season of competition.

Notes

Membership timeline

Commissioners 
Michael Slive 1995–2002
Britton Banowsky 2002–2015
Judy MacLeod 2015–present

Sports

Sports sponsored
Conference USA sponsors championship competition in nine men's and 11 women's NCAA sanctioned sports. Three schools are affiliate members—one in baseball and two in beach volleyball, with one of the beach volleyball associates becoming a full member in July 2023. Men's soccer and women's swimming and diving were dropped as conference sports after the 2021-22 season.

Men's sponsored sports by school
Departing members in pink.

Men's varsity sports not sponsored by Conference USA

Women's sponsored sports by school
Departing members in pink.

Women's varsity sports not sponsored by Conference USA

Football
Conference USA used a divisional format for football from 2005 to 2021.
 For the most recent season, see 2022 Conference USA football season.

C-USA champions

Bowl games

The highest-ranked champion from the so-called "Group of Five" conferences (The American, C-USA, MAC, Mountain West, and Sun Belt) is guaranteed a berth in one of the non-semifinal bowls of the College Football Playoff if the group's top team is not in the playoff.

For the 2014–19 seasons, Conference USA is guaranteed at least five of the following bowl games.

Rivalries

Current or former C-USA in conference rivalries:

Men's basketball 

 For the current season, see 2022–23 Conference USA men's basketball season.

This list goes through the 2017–18 season.

Women's basketball 

This list goes through the 2012–13 season.

Baseball

Championships

Current C-USA champions
Champions from the previous school year are in italics. "RS" is regular season, "T" is tournament. Women's swimming & diving was dropped after the 2021–22 season.

Fall 2022

Winter 2022–23

Spring 2023

National champions

No current C-USA member has won a national team championship while a member of the conference. The only school to have won such a championship while a C-USA member is Marshall, which moved to the Sun Belt Conference in 2022. Marshall won the 2020–21 men's soccer championship in May 2021 (with the tournament having moved from its normal schedule in fall 2020 to spring 2021 due to COVID-19).

The following current and future C-USA teams have won national championships when they were not affiliated with C-USA:

Facilities 
Departing members are in pink while future members are denoted in blue.

Notes

Media 
In 2016, C-USA began a long-term television contract with lead partners ESPN and CBS Sports Network, with ESPN carrying 5 football games and the football championship game; and CBSSN carrying 6 football games, 5 basketball games, and both the men's and women's basketball championship games. C-USA also renewed and expanded its partnership with American Sports Network; owned and operated by Sinclair Broadcast Group, ASN will carry between 15 and 30 football games; between 13 and 55 men's basketball games; and between 2 and 5 women's basketball games.   ASN will also carry 10 events in other C-USA sports.

The conference also entered into a contract with beIN Sports for 10 football games (marking the first domestic American football rights the network has ever acquired, and the first broadcast rights deal it had ever entered into with a college conference), 10 men's and 10 women's basketball games, 12 baseball and 12 softball games, 10 men's and 10 women's soccer games (excluding conference men's soccer games at Kentucky and South Carolina, covered by their primary conference's contract), and 10 women's volleyball games.

The total values of the 2016 contracts are notably lower than those of the previous contracts (which included Fox Sports).

Men's soccer associate members Kentucky and South Carolina have an agreement with their primary conference for other sports to carry all home matches online through the SEC Network service, including all Conference USA conference matches.  ESPN and the SEC Network will have first rights to all C-USA home men's soccer matches featuring both schools.

In 2017 American Sports Network and Campus Insiders merged creating Stadium.  Stadium's C-USA content will be available to stream on Twitter and Pluto TV.   In 2017 Stadium completed a deal with Facebook to exclusively stream some C-USA football games.  In 2017 C-USA entered an agreement with the streaming subscription service FloSports to stream three football games.

CUSA.tv

In 2016 C-USA partnered with SIDEARM Sports to create a subscription based streaming service named CUSA.tv.  In a statement C-USA Commissioner Judy MacLeod said, "Thanks to our partnership with SIDEARM Sports, this new site showcases a clean modern look with easy access to information and we are proud to offer live content and original feature stories through our CUSA.tv." Various sports including football, basketball, and baseball will exclusively air on CUSA.tv when they are not picked up by other networks.

Academics
One of the current member schools, Rice University is a member of the Association of American Universities (AAU), an organization of 62 leading research universities in the United States and Canada. Six of the Conference's fourteen members are doctorate-granting universities with "very high research activity," the highest classification given by the Carnegie Foundation for the Advancement of Teaching. A majority of the Conference's members are ranked as Tier One National Universities in U.S. News & World Reports 2022 Best Colleges rankings.

Notes

Notes

References

External links 

 

 
Sports in Irving, Texas
Organizations established in 1995
Articles which contain graphical timelines
College sports in Alabama
College sports in Arkansas
College sports in Florida
College sports in Kentucky
College sports in Louisiana
College sports in North Carolina
College sports in Tennessee